Declan Meehan is an Irish radio presenter. Currently fronting The Morning Show with local radio station East Coast FM, his career has incorporated involvement with multiple pirate radio stations (including Radio Milinda, the first to be raided and prosecuted) and, later, RTE Radio 2 (where he was one of the pioneering station's original presenters). From there he moved to the superpirates of the 1980s, before a spell with legal radio in London, England. He is remembered for "presenting a cool and calm front". on the morning that Radio Nova was raided in May 1983. He had joined the station from Sunshine Radio.

When Radio Milinda was threatened with closure in December 1972, Meehan declared on air in the week prior to the eventual raid, that they would "fight anybody who tried to close them down". Years later, he commented on the raid: "We were fined £2, all the equipment was confiscated and it was great fun, a great adventure."

List of stations worked with

 Radio Vanessa 1970–1972
 Radio Milinda 1972
 RTÉ Trinity Radio 1976 Temporary Licence
 ARD 1976–1978
 Big D 1978 (Declan Matthews)
 ARD 1979
 RTÉ Radio 2 1979–1980
 Sunshine Radio 1980–1982
 Radio Nova 1982–1984
 Capital Radio London 1984–1988
 RTÉ Millennium Radio 1988
 Century Radio 1989–1991
 FM 104 1992–1996
 East Coast FM 1994–present. He has presented the weekday mid-morning slot for many years,
 Radio Ireland/Today FM 1997–2016. "Sunday Breakfast with Declan Meehan" 7am - 10am every Sunday morning

References

Year of birth missing (living people)
Living people
RTÉ 2fm presenters
Today FM presenters
East Coast FM presenters